Hamacher is a surname. Notable people with the surname include:

 Jason Hamacher, American musician
 Thomas Hamacher (born 1964), German physicist and professor
 Werner Hamacher (1948–2017), German literary critic

See also
 Amacher